Henricus Hondius may refer to two possibly unrelated engravers and cartographers:

 Hendrik Hondius I (1573 –1650), born in Duffel, worked in The Hague, known for his Pictorum aliquot celebrium praecipue Germaniae Inferioris effigies, Hagae Comitis, 1610
 Hendrik Hondius II (1597–1651), lived and worked in Amsterdam, known for his map in the Mercator-Hondius Atlas from 1627
 Hendrik Hondius III (1615–1677), born and worked in The Hague, son of Hendrik Hondius I